Radcliff is a home rule-class city in Hardin County, Kentucky, in the United States. The population was 21,692 at the 2010 census, and in 2019 the estimated population was 22,914. It is included in the Elizabethtown–Fort Knox Metropolitan Area.

Its economy is largely dominated by the adjacent U.S. Army base Fort Knox and by the nearby city of Elizabethtown. Radcliff's population previously fluctuated greatly depending on the deployments of the units at the base, but the BRAC reorganization of 2005, and the quartering of the U.S. Army's Human Resources Command to Fort Knox has created a larger and more stable population.

Geography
Radcliff is in northern Hardin County at  (37.829918, -85.945541). It is bordered to the north by Fort Knox and to the west by Vine Grove. U.S. Route 31W runs through the east side of the city, leading north  to Louisville and south  to Elizabethtown.

The former unincorporated community of Rogersville, named for a local family, is in the southern part of Radcliff along US 31W and Kentucky Route 447.

History

Incorporated in 1956, Radcliff was first settled in 1919, when Horace McCullum subdivided lots along Wilson Avenue and sold them at auction to the highest bidder. McCullum named the new community after Major William Radcliffe, head of the Quartermaster Corps at the newly established Camp Henry Knox. After selling the general store he had opened in the new town, McCullum no longer played a role in its development.

The next significant step in Radcliff's history took place during the 1930s when Fort Knox expanded and dislocated the towns of Stithton and New Stithton, causing various residents and businesses of those communities to move to Radcliff. During World War II, thousands of soldiers trained at Fort Knox and spent their leisure hours at the USO in Radcliff.

Hardin Water District No. 1 was formed in 1953, and became a reality in 1955 with the sale of bonds to finance the project. Today, the water district is the principal source of fresh water to all Hardin County. Radcliff's fire department was established in 1955, with Joseph B. Hutcherson the first fire chief. The Radcliff Civic Club was also organized that year. The city incorporated in March 1956 as a 6th-class city. Radcliff Police Department was formed with officers paid on a fee basis. The population was estimated at 800. Radcliff's population growth over the last 50 years is due to the transient military population, and trends are showing a plateau and decline. At one time, Radcliff was larger than Elizabethtown, but that was short-lived after the 2000 census and more so after the BRAC transformation at the beginning of the 21st century. Starting with 800 in 1956, the Census Bureau reported populations of 3,381 in 1960, 8,281 in 1970, 14,519 in 1980, and 21,961 in 2000.

In 1988, a youth group from the First Assembly of God in Radcliff was involved in the worst drunk-driving accident in U.S. history, a bus accident in which a drunk driver going the wrong way on Interstate 71 hit the group's vehicle, killing 27 people. 

In mid-October 2011, the city voted to approve alcohol sales, which began in January 2012.

Former Kentucky state representative Mike Weaver was elected mayor in 2014 and took office in 2015 for a four-year term. City council members Barbara Baker, Stan Holmes, Edward L. Palmer, T. W. Shortt, Kim Thompson and Chris Yates were also elected in 2014 and took office in 2015, each for a two-year term.

The November 8, 2016, general election for Radcliff City Council ended with all current councilmembers reelected except Shortt, who had run for Kentucky State Representative. Radcliff community leader and businesswoman Tanya Seabrooks was elected to fill the seat Shortt vacated, defeating five other candidates. She took the oath of office in December 2016 for a two-year term. Shortt was defeated in his bid for state representative by the incumbent, Dean Schamore.

In the 2020 general election for the City Council, all but two incumbent members of the city council were re-elected. Barbara Baker lost her seat after finishing eighth in the race and Edward Palmer decided not to run for re-election. The two newly elected to the council were Terry Owens who finished second and Toshie Murrell who finished fifth. Incumbent Tanya Seabrooks was re-elected, having finished fourth, but died a month after the election. In a special-called meeting on January 7, 2021, the city council unanimously appointed Aundra Lett Jackson, who finished seventh in the race, as the council's sixth member to serve Seabrooks' term.

The 2022 election for the Radcliff City Council saw incumbents Terry Owens, Kim Thompson, Pamela DeRoche, and Toshie Murrell win re-election. Chris Yates did not run for another term on the city council, instead running as a Democratic Party candidate in the magisterial election for the first district of the Hardin County fiscal court, where he defeated independent candidate Edward Palmer. Aundra Lett Jackson did not win enough votes to secure a second term. Jerry Brown, who had previously served five terms as a member of the city council, and Michelle Harmon, an owner of an ice cream shop and a volunteer in the community, won seats on the city council. Brown and Harmon were sworn in as members of the City Council on December 20, 2022.

Demographics

As of the census of 2000, there were 21,961 people, 8,487 households, and 5,856 families residing in the city. The racial makeup of the city was 62.76% White, 25.65% African American, 0.61% Native American, 3.52% Asian, 0.41% Pacific Islander, 2.60% from other races, and 4.46% from two or more races. Hispanic or Latino of any race were 5.66% of the population.

There were 8,487 households, out of which 38.5% had children under the age of 18 living with them, 48.7% were married couples living together, 16.1% had a female householder with no husband present, and 31.0% were non-families. 26.0% of all households were made up of individuals, and 6.1% had someone living alone who was 65 years of age or older. The average household size was 2.57 and the average family size was 3.09.

In the city, the population was spread out, with 29.1% under the age of 18, 9.6% from 18 to 24, 32.6% from 25 to 44, 20.0% from 45 to 64, and 8.6% who were 65 years of age or older. The median age was 33 years. For every 100 females, there were 95.0 males. For every 100 females age 18 and over, there were 91.0 males.

The median income for a household in the city was $35,763, and the median income for a family was $41,260. Males had a median income of $30,518 versus $20,982 for females. The per capita income for the city was $16,436. About 11.3% of families and 12.5% of the population were below the poverty line, including 18.0% of those under age 18 and 3.4% of those age 65 or over.

Education
Radcliff has two public secondary schools within its city limits. Most high-schoolers in the city attend North Hardin High School, with some zoned to attend John Hardin High School (which is in a portion of the city served by the Elizabethtown post office). There are also: North Park Elementary, Woodland Elementary, Meadowview Elementary, North Middle School, Radcliff Elementary and the all-grades North Hardin Christian School private school run by Radcliff's Fellowship Independent Baptist Church.

Radcliff had a lending library, a branch of the Hardin County Public Library. The North Branch was closed in September 2020. The building that was once the library was sold by the Hardin County Fiscal Court on July 26, 2022.

See also
 Other places named Radcliff

References

External links
 City of Radcliff official website

Cities in Hardin County, Kentucky
Cities in Kentucky
Elizabethtown metropolitan area
Populated places established in 1919